Frederick Brian Webb Farmer (29 July 1933 – 1 June 2014) was an English professional footballer who made 249 appearances in the Football League for Birmingham City and Bournemouth & Boscombe Athletic. He played at right back.

Born in Wordsley, Staffordshire, Farmer joined Birmingham City in 1950 as an amateur when he was 17. He turned professional in 1954 and made his first-team debut in 1956, but was used only as cover when Jeff Hall or Ken Green were injured or on international duty. He became a first-team regular following Hall's death in 1959, but lost his place to new signing Stan Lynn some two-and-a-half years later. He left the club in January 1962 having made 145 appearances in all competitions, of which 117 were in the First Division. He also played 17 games in European competition, appearing in the 1960 and 1961 finals of the Inter-Cities Fairs Cup. He went on to play 132 league games for Bournemouth & Boscombe Athletic, including playing many games as team captain. He later worked as a scout for Aston Villa and AFC Bournemouth.

Farmer died in hospital on 1 June 2014 at the age of 80.

Notes

References

1933 births
2014 deaths
People from Wordsley
English footballers
Association football fullbacks
Birmingham City F.C. players
AFC Bournemouth players
English Football League players
Place of death missing